State Road 529 (NM 529) is a  state highway in the US state of New Mexico. NM 529's western terminus is at U.S. Route 82 (US 82) east of Loco Hills, and the eastern terminus is at US 62 and US 180 west of Hobbs.

Major intersections

See also

References

529
Transportation in Eddy County, New Mexico
Transportation in Lea County, New Mexico